La Lucila is a neighborhood in Vicente López Partido, Buenos Aires Province, Argentina. The community is a suburb in the Buenos Aires metropolitan area.

It has a light railway station (La Lucila) on the Retiro-Tigre line - north on the line is Martínez and south is Olivos. It is also close to the Tren de la Costa.

The name comes from a large mansion that was named for the owner's wife. He was teniente coronel Alfredo F. de Urquiza and his wife was named Lucila Marcelina Anchorena de Urquiza.

Education

Asociación Escuelas Lincoln, an American international school, is in La Lucila.

References

External links

Vicente López Partido
Populated places in Buenos Aires Province
Cities in Argentina
Argentina